BBC Research & Development is the technical research department of the BBC.

Function

It has responsibility for researching and developing advanced and emerging media technologies for the benefit of the corporation, and wider UK and European media industries, and is also the technical design authority for a number of major technical infrastructure transformation projects for the UK broadcasting industry.

Structure
BBC R&D is part of the wider BBC Design & Engineering, and is led by Jatin Aythora, Director, Research & Development. In 2011, the North Lab moved into MediaCityUK in Salford  along with several other departments of the BBC, whilst the South Lab remained in White City in London.

History

In April 1930 the Development section of the BBC became the Research Department.

The department as it stands today was formed in 1993 from the merger of the BBC Designs Department and the BBC Research Department. From 2006 to 2008 it was known as Research and Innovation  but has since reverted to its original name. BBC Research & Development has made major contributions to broadcast technology, carrying out original research in many areas, and developing items like the peak programme meter (PPM) which became the basis for many world standards.

Innovations
It has also been involved in many well-known consumer technologies such as teletext, DAB, NICAM and Freeview. It was at the forefront of the development of FM radio, stereo FM, and RDS. These innovations have led to Queen's Awards for Innovation in 1969, 1974, 1983, 1987, 1992, 1998, 2001 and 2011.

In the 1970s, its engineers designed the famous LS3/5A studio monitor for use in outside broadcasting units. Licensed to manufacturers, the loudspeaker sold 100,000 pairs in its 20+ years' life.

Closure of Kingswood Warren and move to London and Salford
In early 2010 the department had approximately 135 staff based at three locations: White City in London, Kingswood Warren in Kingswood, Surrey, and the R&D (North Lab) at the BBC's Manchester offices at New Broadcasting House, Oxford Road, Manchester. In early 2010 the Kingswood Warren site was vacated and the bulk of the department relocated to Centre House, in White City, London co-locating with the main campus of the BBC in London, whilst a significant number have moved to the new North Lab in MediaCityUK in Salford.

 BBC R&D has more than 200 employees in their UK labs.

Future projects
BBC R&D engineers and researchers are currently active on approximately 50 projects, including 7 active national and international collaborative research efforts.

These include R&D projects built around BBC Redux—the proof of concept for the cross-platform, Flash video-based streaming version of the BBC iPlayer.

See also

 A-weighting
 Backstage.bbc.co.uk
 CEEFAX
 Dirac (codec)
 Equal-loudness contour
 ITU-R 468 noise weighting
 
 NICAM
 Peak programme meter
 Sound-in-Syncs
 VERA videotape format

References

External links
 
 BBC R&D Reports list 1933 - 1996 (PDF, 965 kB)
 
 Move
 Location of South Lab

Video clips
 History of the department and interviews with the staff
 Talk by Matthew Postgate in Manchester in November 2009 at TEDx

 
Audio engineering
Digital Video Broadcasting
Engineering research institutes
Freeview (UK)
Organisations based in Salford
Organisations based in Surrey
Radio technology
Reigate and Banstead
Research institutes in England
Science and technology in Greater Manchester
Scientific organizations established in 1923
Sound production technology
Sound recording technology
Television technology
1923 establishments in the United Kingdom